Omar Jasika was the defending champion, but he chose not to participate. Taylor Harry Fritz won the title, defeating Tommy Paul in the final, 6–2, 6–7(4–7), 6–2.

Seeds

Main draw

Finals

Top half

Section 1

Section 2

Bottom half

Section 3

Section 4

Qualifying

Seeds

Qualifiers

Draw

First qualifier

Second qualifier

Third qualifier

Fourth qualifier

Fifth qualifier

Sixth qualifier

Seventh qualifier

Eighth qualifier

References

External links 
 Draw

Boys' Singles
US Open, 2015 Boys' Singles